The Bad Cache Rapids Formation is a geologic formation in Northwest Territories. It preserves fossils dating back to the Ordovician period.

See also

 List of fossiliferous stratigraphic units in Northwest Territories

References
 

Ordovician Northwest Territories
Ordovician southern paleotropical deposits